Parachela is an order of tardigrades in the class Eutardigrada. Members of this order have existed for at least 72 million years, including the present. The oldest known species is Beorn leggi.

Superfamilies and families 
The order includes the following superfamilies and families:

 Eohypsiboiidea
 Eohypsibiidae
 Hypsibioidea
 Calohypsibiidae
 Hypsibiidae
 Microhypsibiidae
 Ramazzottiidae
 Isohypsibioidea
 Hexapodibiidae
 Isohypsibiidae
 Macrobiotoidea
 Beornidae
 Macrobiotidae
 Murrayidae
 Necopinatidae
 Richtersiidae

References

External links 
 
 

 
Protostome orders
Polyextremophiles